Horween may refer to:

 Ralph Horween, American football player and coach, brother of Arnold Horween
 Arnold Horween, American football player and coach, brother of Ralph Horween
 Horween Leather Company, an American tannery located in Chicago